NHS Digital is the trading name of the Health and Social Care Information Centre, which is the national provider of information, data and IT systems for commissioners, analysts and clinicians in health and social care in England, particularly those involved with the National Health Service of England. The organisation is an executive non-departmental public body of the Department of Health and Social Care.

Role 
NHS Digital provides digital services for the NHS and social care, including the management of large health informatics programmes. They deliver national systems through in-house teams, and by contracting private suppliers. These services include managing patient data including the Spine, which allows the secure sharing of information between different parts of the NHS, and forms the basis of the Electronic Prescription Service, Summary Care Record and Electronic Referral Service.

NHS Digital is also the national collator of information about health and social care, and publishes over 260 statistical publications each year, including Official Statistics and National Statistics. It also runs "The NHS Website" (www.nhs.uk, formerly NHS Choices), which is the national website for the NHS in England.

NHS Digital has taken on the roles of a number of predecessor bodies including the NHS Information Centre, NHS Connecting for Health, and parts of NHS Direct. The organisation produces more than 260 official and national statistical publications. This includes national comparative data for secondary uses, developed from the long-running Hospital Episode Statistics which can help local decision makers to improve the quality and efficiency of frontline care.

History
The organisation was created as a special health authority on 1 April 2005 by a merger of the National Programme for IT, part of the Department of Health, the NHS Information Authority, and the Prescribing Support Unit.

Following the Health and Social Care Act 2012, the HSCIC changed from a special health authority to an executive non-departmental public body on 1 April 2013. Effective at this time, HSCIC took over parts of the troubled NHS National Programme for IT from the agency NHS Connecting for Health (CfH) which ceased to exist. It also runs the Health Survey for England.

On 20 April 2016, it was announced that HSCIC would be rebranding, changing its name to NHS Digital in July 2016.

NHSX, created in February 2019, has oversight of digital strategy and policy in NHS England. As a budget-holder, NHSX commissions projects from NHS Digital.

On November 22 2021, it was announced that NHS Digital would be merged with NHSX and incorporated into NHS England.

Business areas

Handling patient data
NHS Digital runs the Spine service for the NHS, which is a central, secure system for patient data in England.   This enables a number of services for patients, including:
 the Electronic Prescription Service, which sends prescriptions digitally from GP surgeries and other NHS providers to pharmacies, without needing a printed prescription
 the Summary Care Record which allows authorised NHS staff (such as hospital or ambulance staff) to see a summary of important information about a patient, to help give the best care.
 the e-referral service which manages the booking of first time appointments with hospitals and specialists
 the Child Protection - Information Sharing system, which helps ensure that any child protection concerns are known by the NHS when they are treated

As the HSCIC, the organisation ran the care.data programme, which was cancelled in 2016.

NHS Digital collects the national 'Hospital Episode Statistics' (HES), which is a record of every 'episode' of admitted patient care (counted by completing care with a consultant, meaning that more than one episode can be associated with a single stay in hospital) delivered by the NHS in England, including those done under contract by private providers.  This involves the tracking of around 16 million 'episodes' of care every year.  This information is used for a range of statistical analysis, as well as for determining payments to providers. In addition to admitted patient care, HES also provides data for outpatient and emergency care encounters. The Emergency Care Data Set has been created to replace HES A&E data and provide better data on emergency care encounters.

In November 2019 it launched the National Record Locator, which spans different health economies and is intended to enable paramedics, community mental health nurses, children’s health teams and maternity services to access the records of mental health patients across England.

In August 2020 it launched a pilot electronic prescription service in three hospital trusts, where hospital prescriptions were sent electronically to the patient’s community pharmacy, as during the COVID-19 pandemic in England most outpatient consultations were held remotely.

Central technology team
A troubleshooting operation was established in 2018 to help NHS trusts when major IT deployments go wrong. Eight trusts needed emergency assistance in 2018 after a deployment led to severe service disruptions.  Funding of £2 million a year for the service has been allocated and expansion is expected.

Statistics and data
NHS Digital compiles national data about the NHS and social care, with over 260 publications every year.  In addition, they provide data analysis, and access to data and clinical indicators.

Public-facing services
The NHS website www.nhs.uk, formerly NHS Choices, is the public website for the NHS Services in England, and is run by a team at NHS Digital, mandated by DOH with input from Public Health England.  In November 2022 it had  been visited more than one billion times in the previous 12 months.

Key people 
Simon Bolton, formerly chief information officer at Jaguar Land Rover and NHS Test and Trace, was appointed as interim chief executive officer in June 2021. He replaced Sarah Wilkinson, CEO from August 2017 until she decided to step down in March 2021.

References

External links 
 
 NHS.UK, the NHS website

2005 establishments in the United Kingdom
Government agencies established in 2005
Department of Health and Social Care
Health in Yorkshire
Health informatics in the United Kingdom
Non-departmental public bodies of the United Kingdom government
Organisations based in Leeds
NHS special health authorities
Health informatics organizations
Databases in England
Medical databases
National Health Service (England)